Boniface Haba (born 30 September 1996) is a Guinean footballer who plays as a winger for Horoya and the Guinea national team.

International career
Haba made his debut with the Guinea national team in a 2–0 2016 African Nations Championship qualification win over Senegal on 17 October 2015.

References

External links
 
 
 
 Horoya Profile

1996 births
Living people
People from Kindia
Guinean footballers
Guinea international footballers
Association football wingers
Horoya AC players
Guinée Championnat National players
Guinea A' international footballers
2016 African Nations Championship players
2020 African Nations Championship players